The 2005 World Men's Curling Championship (branded as 2005 Ford World Men's Curling Championship for sponsorship reasons) was held from April 2–10, 2005 at the new Save-on-Foods Memorial Centre in Victoria, British Columbia. The tournament was the first since the 1988 event that was held separately from the 2005 World Women's Curling Championship (held in Paisley, Scotland in March 2005). The winner was Randy Ferbey and his team from Canada. Ferbey won his fourth world championship, the rest of his team won their third. As a country, it was Canada's 29th World Championship. Scotland won silver, and Germany bronze.

For the first time ever, the World championships used the page playoff system where the top four teams with the best records at the end of round-robin play meet in the playoff rounds.

Teams
One reason for the separation of the men's and women's tournaments was to allow for an expansion from 10 to 12 teams. This expansion was deemed appropriate because more countries are now producing competitive rinks, particularly in Europe but also including Japan and even New Zealand. Teams included 3 time World Champion Randy Ferbey of Canada, 2002 Silver medalist Pål Trulsen of Norway, 2001 Silver medalist Andreas Schwaller of Switzerland, 1997 Silver medalist Andy Kapp of Germany, 2 time World bronze medalist Markku Uusipaavalniemi of Finland, 1993 bronze medalist Pete Fenson of the United States, 7 time World Championship participant Hugh Millikin of Australia, 3 time participant Sean Becker of New Zealand, 2 time participant Johnny Frederiksen of Denmark and making their first appearances were Stefano Ferronato's team from Italy, David Murdoch's team from Scotland and Eric Carlsén's team from Sweden.

Round-robin standings

Final round-robin standings

To first break the massive 6-way tie at 8-3, the two teams with the best record against the other teams involved (Scotland and Germany) were given automatic playoff spots. The other teams were ranked based on their record against each other, or if that didn't break the tie, a draw to the button which occurred before the tournament began. These other four teams then played tie-breakers to determine the other 2 playoff spots. The winning teams of the tiebreakers should match up in a 3vs4 game to determine the other semi finalist

Round-robin results

Draw 1
April 2, 11:00

Draw 2
April 2, 18:30

Draw 3
April 3, 09:30

Draw 4
April 3, 14:00

Draw 5
April 3, 18:30

Draw 6
April 4, 09:00

Draw 7
April 4, 15:00

Draw 8
April 4, 19:30

Draw 9
April 5, 09:00

Draw 10
April 5, 15:00

Draw 11
April 5, 19:30

Draw 12
April 6, 09:00

Draw 13
April 6, 15:00

Draw 14
April 6, 19:30

Draw 15
April 7, 09:00

Draw 16
April 7, 15:00

Draw 17
April 7, 19:30

Tiebreaker
April 8, 12:00

Playoffs

Brackets

3 vs. 4 game
April 8, 18:00

1 vs. 2 game
April 8, 22:30

Semi-final
April 9, 14:00

Final
April 10, 12:30

Round-robin player percentages

References
 

2005 Men
World Men's Curling Championship
Ford World Men's Curling Championship
World Men's Curling Championship
Sports competitions in Victoria, British Columbia
Curling in British Columbia
21st century in Victoria, British Columbia
International sports competitions hosted by Canada